João Vicente de Freitas Branco Sassetti (22 January 1892 – 28 May 1946) was a Portuguese épée fencer. He competed individually at the 1920 Summer Olympics and with the Portuguese team in 1920, 1928 and 1936, and won a team bronze medal in 1928, placing fourth in 1920.

References

External links
 

1892 births
1946 deaths
Sportspeople from Lisbon
Portuguese male épée fencers
Olympic fencers of Portugal
Fencers at the 1920 Summer Olympics
Fencers at the 1928 Summer Olympics
Fencers at the 1936 Summer Olympics
Olympic bronze medalists for Portugal
Olympic medalists in fencing
Medalists at the 1928 Summer Olympics

Portuguese people of Italian descent